TGN is a class A A.M. radio station operating in Guatemala City, Guatemala. It is the first ever evangelical broadcaster in Guatemala, and has been on the air for more than 60 years. It transmits with a power of 10,000 watts on 730 kHz.

References

1950 establishments in Guatemala
Guatemala City
Radio stations established in 1950
Radio stations in Guatemala